= Ariadna's Thread =

International festival of creativity for people with mental disabilities

- Locations: Moscow, Russia
- Founded: 2010; 16 years ago
- Website: http://www.klubpsihiatrov.ru/

The Ariadna's Thread (Russian: Нить Ариадны) is an international festival of creativity for people with mental disabilities held in Moscow, Russia since 2010. The festival also includes scientific and practical conferences. Among the venues of the festival: Yermolova Theater, Cinema House, Central House of Scientists of the Russian Academy of Sciences, State Museum of Fine Arts named after A. Pushkin, Department of personal collections and the Museyon Center for Aesthetic Education of Children and Youth, Moscow Academic Art Lyceum of the Russian Academy of Arts, Scientific and Practical Center for the Mental Health of Children and Adolescents, and Multimedia Art Museum, Moscow Drama Theater under the direction of A. Dzhigarkhanyan, Theater of the Moon.

== Programmes ==
Participants are nominated in seven categories: theater, concert, literary creativity, photography, cinema, visual and applied art, multimedia projects (journalism).
